Tiquan Underwood (born February 17, 1987) is an American football coach and former wide receiver who is the wide receivers coach for the Pittsburgh Panthers.  He played college football at Rutgers and was drafted by the Jacksonville Jaguars in the seventh round of the 2009 NFL Draft.

Underwood also played for the New England Patriots, Tampa Bay Buccaneers, and Carolina Panthers in the NFL. He made his CFL debut for the Hamilton Tiger Cats in 2015. Underwood is known for his distinctive hi-top fade hairstyle.

Early years
Underwood grew up in North Brunswick, New Jersey. He played for Notre Dame High School in Lawrenceville, New Jersey. Underwood started as a wide receiver his sophomore and senior years.  He was rated as a two-star recruit by Rivals.com and only received scholarship offers from Rutgers, Vanderbilt, and Maryland.

Playing career

College
During the opening week of the 2007 college football season for Rutgers, Underwood was one of four nominees for the AT&T All-America Player of the Week award.

In 2008, Underwood was named a team captain. After the season, he was the recipient of the Loyal Knight Award, honoring the Rutgers player whose character and dedication have proved resilient in his pursuit of excellence.

Jacksonville Jaguars
Underwood was drafted 253rd overall in the seventh round of the 2009 NFL Draft Jacksonville Jaguars. He was waived on September 5, 2009. He was re-signed to the practice squad on September 6. He was called up from the Jaguars practice squad on September 23, 2009. He was waived on August 25, 2011, after playing in 10 games in 2010.

New England Patriots
On August 29, 2011, Underwood signed with the New England Patriots.
On September 3, five days after signing with Patriots, Underwood was cut. On November 8, 2011, Underwood was signed to the 53 man roster to boost a beleaguered kick return squad. He was released on November 12 and re-signed on November 23, 2011. On February 4, 2012, the night before Super Bowl XLVI, he was released. He was re-signed to the Patriots two days after the Super Bowl on February 7, 2012. He was cut again on May 3 after the Patriots had signed Jabar Gaffney. On August 23, 2012, he received his own AFC Championship ring.

Tampa Bay Buccaneers
On May 7, 2012, Underwood signed with the Tampa Bay Buccaneers. He rejoined his former coach Greg Schiano. Underwood was released by the Buccaneers on August 31, 2012 even though many felt he had an impressive training camp. On September 20, 2012, Tiquan was signed again by the Buccaneers when they released wide receiver Preston Parker. On October 21, 2012, Underwood caught his first touchdown pass of his career in a losing effort to the New Orleans Saints. He was released again by the Buccaneers on September 1, 2013 but then re-signed on October 2, 2013.

Carolina Panthers
Underwood signed with the Carolina Panthers on March 21, 2014. He was released on August 24, 2014.

Hamilton Tiger-Cats 
On April 2, 2015, Underwood signed with the Hamilton Tiger Cats of the Canadian Football League (CFL). Underwood played in 14 games in the 2015 season and then 3 in the 2016 season before being released partway through the season in August 2016. In total he caught 45 passes for 711 yards with 3 touchdowns.

Montreal Alouettes 
Underwood was signed to the Montreal Alouettes' practice roster on September 28, 2016. In his first season in Montreal Underwood played in 3 games catching 8 passes for 107 yards with one touchdown. Underwood was resigned for the 2017 season. On July 19, Underwood caught 5 passes for 95 yards and a touchdown, giving him 1,000 yards receiving in both his CFL and NFL careers. He was released by the Alouettes on October 18, 2017.

Coaching career

Lafayette
Shortly after retiring from playing professional football, Underwood was hired as the wide receivers coach for Lafayette for the 2018 season. This was under John Garrett who was his wide receivers coach in Tampa with the Buccaneers.

Miami Dolphins
In 2019, Underwood was hired by the Miami Dolphins as an offensive quality control coach.

Rutgers
In 2020 after a season in Miami, Underwood returned to Rutgers where he played his college football as the team’s wide receivers coach under Greg Schiano, whom Underwood played for in college.

Pittsburgh
After two seasons at his alma mater, Underwood joined the staff at Pittsburgh in January 2022.

References

External links
Carolina Panthers bio
New England Patriots bio
Hamilton Tiger Cats bio

1987 births
Living people
African-American coaches of American football
African-American players of American football
African-American players of Canadian football
American football wide receivers
Canadian football wide receivers
Carolina Panthers players
Hamilton Tiger-Cats players
Jacksonville Jaguars players
Lafayette Leopards football coaches
Miami Dolphins coaches
Montreal Alouettes players
New England Patriots players
Notre Dame High School (New Jersey) alumni
Players of American football from New Jersey
Rutgers Scarlet Knights football coaches
Rutgers Scarlet Knights football players
Sportspeople from New Brunswick, New Jersey
Tampa Bay Buccaneers players
21st-century African-American sportspeople
20th-century African-American people